"Don't You Lie to Me" (sometimes called "I Get Evil") is a song recorded by Tampa Red in 1940.  It became popular with blues artists, leading it to become a blues standard. The song was also interpreted by rock and roll pioneers Fats Domino and Chuck Berry.

Original song
"Don't You Lie to Me" was recorded by Tampa Red approximately midpoint in his prolific recording career, representing the transition from his earlier hokum recordings to his later early Chicago-blues combo style.  This was the same period when he began playing the electric guitar and recorded his best-known blues classics, including "It Hurts Me Too", "Love with a Feeling", and "Anna Lou Blues", the B-side of "Don't You Lie to Me".

The song is a mid-tempo twelve-bar blues that features Tampa Red playing jazz-inflected single-note guitar fills behind his vocals.  Blind John Davis provided the piano accompaniment with an unidentified bass player and, as a throwback to his earlier days, Red added a twelve-bar kazoo solo.  Although many later versions are credited to other artists, they usually use some, if not most, of Tampa Red's lyrics:

Recordings by other artists
Fats Domino recorded "Don't You Lie to Me" early in his career in 1951 (Imperial 5123).  He used most of Tampa Red's lyrics and, although there is a full backing band, his trademark piano accompaniment dominates the recording.  Domino received sole credit for the song, as did Chuck Berry when he recorded a rock and roll version for his 1961 album New Juke-Box Hits.

In 1962, Albert King recorded "Don't You Lie to Me" as "I Get Evil" (Bobbin 135), which was included on his first album The Big Blues.  King's version uses an Afro-Cuban style rhythm, which he would later use for his 1967 hit "Crosscut Saw".  Later, King with Stevie Ray Vaughan recorded it live for television in 1983, which is included on Albert King with Stevie Ray Vaughan in Session. In 1977, B.B. King recorded the song for the opening track on  his King Size album. An AllMusic album review noted its "nice, rolling groove that King rides real easy".

Notes

1940 songs
Tampa Red songs
1951 singles
Fats Domino songs
Chuck Berry songs
Albert King songs
Pretty Things songs
Blues songs